Kizha Ambur railway station belongs to the Madurai railway division and is also officially known by its code: KIB. This railway station is present between Alwarkurichi railway station and Ambasamudram. Daily 4 passenger trains from Tirunelveli (TEN) to Senkottai (SCT) and 4 passenger trains from Senkottai to Tirunelveli halt here. This railway station is useful for hamlets and villages like Poovankurichi, Kovankulam, Kizha Ambur, Karuthapillaiyur, Sivasailam, Agastiarpuram, and Mela Ambur.

References

External links 

Madurai railway division
Railway stations in Tirunelveli district